Vientiane International School (VIS) is the only international school in Vientiane, Laos, that offers the International Baccalaureate Programme for grades K - 12.  VIS is the only school in Laos accredited by WASC, CIS, and the IB.

Profile
On 1991. Vientiane International School (VIS) is an International Baccalaureate World School in Vientiane, Laos, established in 1991. VIS now has an enrollment of approximately 495  students from Preschool through to Grade 12. VIS offers all three IB programmes, the PYP for ages 4–10, and MYP for ages 11 – 15, along with the IB Diploma in Grades 11 and 12 for ages 16 – 18. Classes have a maximum size of 22 students. All primary classes have a full-time teacher assistant to support learning programmes.
VIS has students from close to 46 different countries with no nationality being greater than 21% of the total. Families within the VIS community come from embassy and diplomatic staff, non-government development and aid agencies and the rapidly expanding international business area.

On 1995. Students who graduate from VIS attend university in countries such as Australia, United States, Canada, Singapore, Thailand, Great Britain, The Netherlands and New Zealand.  The school is governed by an elected Board of Trustees. This group of nine parents set policy, oversee financial decisions and identify strategic direction. The school administration consists of the Director, Elsa Donohue, who operates as the head of school, a primary principal who is responsible for all educational matters from three-year-olds to grade five, and the secondary principal, Tina Santilli, who oversees the grade six to twelve educational Programme.

On 2001. VIS is a member of the Mekong River International School Association (MRISA) which enables students to compete in sporting tournaments and cultural exchanges with other international schools in Thailand, Vietnam and Cambodia.

On 2006. The school is also a member of the East Asia Regional Council of Overseas Schools (EARCOS) which supports accredited schools through provision of world class professional development for faculty.   The school has full accreditation from the Council of International Schools, the Western Association of Schools and Colleges and the International Baccalaureate. VIS is the only school in Laos that is a member of these associations.

Facilities
VIS moved to a new facility in August 2008, allowing the school to accept more students and provide them with a newer environment to heighten learning opportunities. The school has also recently built a swimming pool and a fitness centre that is usable by students and other parts of the school community.

VIS consists of six main buildings: the office, a 2-floor primary building and a 3-floor secondary building, the library, the cafe / canteen, and the newly built fitness centre. It also has other facilities such as two football pitches, two basketball courts, a black box theater (within the secondary building), and a swimming pool next to the fitness centre.

References

External links

MRISA Schools
Educational institutions established in 1991
Buildings and structures in Vientiane
International schools in Laos
1991 establishments in Laos